is a railway station on the Kyūdai Main Line operated by JR Kyushu in Kusu, Ōita Prefecture, Japan.

Lines

Layout 
The station consists of a side platform platform a single track on a side hill cutting overlooking the main road and a deep river valley. The station building, a modern structure built of timber, is unstaffed and serves only as a waiting room. From the access road, a flight of steps or a long slope leads up to the station building. Another ramp or flight of steps leads to a slightly higher level where the platform is located.

Adjacent stations

History
Japanese National Railways (JNR) opened the station on 15 March 1957 as an additional station on the existing track of the Kyudai Main Line. With the privatization of JNR on 1 April 1987, JR Kyushu took over control of the station.

Passenger statistics
In fiscal 2015, there were a total of 3,465 boarding passengers, giving a daily average of 10 passengers.

See also
 List of railway stations in Japan

References

External links
Sugikawachi (JR Kyushu)

Railway stations in Ōita Prefecture
Railway stations in Japan opened in 1957